The 2010–11 season saw Dynamo Dresden challenge for promotion from the 3. Liga for the first time since its foundation in 2008. After shaky start, they found themselves in contention for third place, behind the top two of Eintracht Braunschweig and Hansa Rostock. When a poor run of form in March and April put this position into jeopardy, manager Matthias Maucksch was sacked and replaced with Ralf Loose. The change had the desired effect - Dynamo win five of their last six games (drawing the other), beating Kickers Offenbach on the last day of the season to secure third place, and a playoff with VfL Osnabrück, who had finished third bottom in the 2. Bundesliga.

The first leg of the playoff, in Dresden, ended in a 1–1 draw, as did the 90 minutes of the second leg, but Dynamo scored two goals in extra time to win 4–2 on aggregate and return to the second division after a five-year absence.

Squad

Results

3. Liga

Playoff

Dynamo Dresden won 4–2 on aggregate; Dynamo promoted, Osnabrück relegated

DFB-Pokal

Saxony Cup

Transfers

In

Out

References

External links
Season details at fussballdaten 

Dynamo Dresden seasons
Dynamo Dresden